Mayu Kishi-Kawagoe is a Japanese international table tennis player.

She won a bronze medal at the 2001 World Table Tennis Championships in the women's doubles with Akiko Takeda.

See also
 List of table tennis players

References

Japanese female table tennis players
Living people
World Table Tennis Championships medalists
Year of birth missing (living people)